The Milton Keynes Knights are a  Speedway team which originally operated from 1978 until their closure in 1992. The team were revived in 2012 but have had to race at various venues outside of Milton Keynes.

History

1978–1988
The inaugural league season for the team was during the 1978 National League season, in which they finished in 16th place. The team were based at the Milton Keynes Greyhound Stadium on the Groveway, in Ashland, Milton Keynes. The team continued to compete in division 2 (known as the National League at the time) until 1988, with a best place finish of 3rd in 1987.

1989–1992
In 1989, the team moved to the new stadium at Elfield Park. The team ran for another four seasons at this venue but finished no higher than 11th during that time. Following complaints of noise from local residents and falling crowds the track closed in 1992. The site at Elfield Park had been used as a training track known as Bleak Hall.

2012–present
The Knights returned in 2012, competing in the Midland Development League, with home matches staged initially staged at Rye House stadium. In more recent years the Knights have continued to track share having raced out of Mildenhall, Peterborough and as of 2019 in Birmingham.

Season summary

References

Sport in Milton Keynes